Viburnum macrocephalum ( "hydrangea viburnum", or  "tree hydrangea"), common name Chinese snowball, is a species of flowering plant in the family Adoxaceae (formerly Caprifoliaceae), native to mainland China.  Its fertile form, Viburnum macrocephalum f. keteleeri (qiong hua, "white jade flower"), is of great cultural significance in China.

Gallery

References

macrocephalum